Matthew Ruby is an American politician and military officer serving as a member of the North Dakota House of Representatives from the 40th district. Elected in November 2016, he assumed office on December 1, 2016.

Early life and education 
Ruby was born and raised in Minot, North Dakota. He studied history and elementary education at Minot State University, but did not earn a degree.

Career 
Ruby has served as a member of the 815th Engineer Company with the United States Army. He also worked as a recruiter for the North Dakota Army National Guard. Since 2010, he has served as a staff sergeant and heavy equipment operator in the North Dakota Army National Guard. He is also the owner of 5R Construction. Ruby was elected to the North Dakota House of Representatives in November 2016 and assumed office on December 1, 2016.

References 

Living people
People from Minot, North Dakota
Republican Party members of the North Dakota House of Representatives
People from Ward County, North Dakota
21st-century American politicians
Year of birth missing (living people)